Pirates is the second studio album by American singer-songwriter Rickie Lee Jones, released on July 15, 1981 by Warner Bros. Records. The follow-up to her 1979 self-titled debut album, Pirates is partially an account of her break-up with fellow musician Tom Waits after the success of her debut album. The cover is a 1976-copyrighted photo by Brassaï.

Recording 
Initial recording for Pirates began in January 1980, with the live recordings for "Skeletons" and "The Returns" from January 30 from these sessions kept on the final album. In the same month, Jones picked up a Grammy Award for Best New Artist.

Jones came to album sessions at Warner Bros. Recording Studios in North Hollywood with five songs, which were recorded and arranged in a two-month spurt in early 1980 before Jones was given an extended break for further writing. Album sessions reconvened in November 1980 and concluded in April 1981, three months before the album release.

All songs were copyrighted on June 9, 1980, as well as "Hey Bub", which was omitted from the album release, except for "Living It Up" and "Traces of the Western Slopes", copyrighted in July 1981, at the time of the album release.

Overview 
Jones relocated to New York City after her split from Tom Waits and soon set up home with a fellow musician, Sal Bernardi from New Jersey, whom she had met in Venice, California, in the mid-1970s, writing in their apartment in Greenwich Village. Bernardi, who had been referenced in the lyrics to "Weasel and the White Boys Cool" from her debut, was to become a frequent collaborator with Jones, and they composed the epic eight-minute suite "Traces of the Western Slopes" together.

Jones started writing the first songs from the album - "Hey Bub" (unreleased until 1983), "We Belong Together" and "Pirates" - in the autumn of 1979.

Elsewhere, the music on Pirates is often cinematic, with influences ranging from Leonard Bernstein to Bruce Springsteen and Laura Nyro. The album is more musically ambitious than its predecessor and explores elements of jazz, R&B, bebop, pop and Broadway, with multiple changes in tempo and mood within most songs.

Critical reception 

Pirates received a perfect five-star rating in Rolling Stone, with Stephen Holden writing; "Rickie Lee Jones' Pirates arrives like a cloudburst in the desert of Eighties formula pop music and recycled heavy-metal rock. Explosively passionate and exhilaratingly eccentric, this freeform, piano-based song cycle compares with Van Morrison's Astral Weeks, Bruce Springsteen's The Wild, the Innocent & the E Street Shuffle, and Joni Mitchell's Court and Spark in the bravura way it weaves autobiography and personal myth into a flexible musical setting that conjures a lifetime's worth of character and incident." He concluded his review by stating; "[i]t's Rickie Lee Jones' voice that carries Pirates to the stars and makes her whole crazy vision not only comprehensible but compulsive, compelling and as welcome as Christmas in July."

Jones was featured for a second time on the cover of the August 6, 1981 issue of Rolling Stone. The Age wrote in their review: "On Pirates, Rickie Lee Jones executes a brilliant artistic leap which not only outshines her Grammy-winning debut album but establishes her as one of the most important singer/songwriters of the decade." The album peaked at No. 5 on the Billboard 200 and was certified Gold by the Recording Industry Association of America on September 30, 1981, for sales of 500,000 copies. The album remained on the UK album charts for three months, and was certified Silver by the British Phonographic Industry.

Track listing
Credits adapted from the album's liner notes.

Personnel

Rickie Lee Jones – vocals, guitar, keyboards, synthesizer, percussion, vocals & horn arrangements
Donald Fagen – synthesizer
Victor Feldman – drums, percussion, keyboards
Rob Mounsey – synthesizer
David Sanborn – alto saxophone
Tom Scott – baritone and tenor saxophone
Ralph Burns – orchestral arrangements
Chuck Rainey – bass
Sal Bernardi – harmonica, vocals
Michael Boddicker – synthesizer
Randy Brecker – trumpet, flugelhorn
Lenny Castro – percussion
Nick DeCaro – orchestral arrangements
Buzz Feiten – guitar
Russell Ferrante – keyboards
Steve Gadd – drums
Jerry Hey – trumpet, flugelhorn, horn
David Kalish – guitar
Randy Kerber – keyboards
Neil Larsen – keyboards
Arno Lucas – backing vocals
Steve Lukather – guitar
Clarence McDonald – keyboards
Dean Parks – guitar
Art Rodriguez – drums
Leslie Smith – backing vocals
Joe Turano – backing vocals
Technical
Loyd Clifft, Mark Linett – engineer
Mike Salisbury – cover design
Brassaï – front cover photography

Charts

Weekly charts

Year-end charts

Certifications

References

External links
Rickie Lee Jones's Official Website

Rickie Lee Jones albums
1981 albums
Albums arranged by Ralph Burns
Albums produced by Lenny Waronker
Albums produced by Russ Titelman
Warner Records albums